Archibald Wishart Young (10 December 1906 – 5 July 1980) was a Scottish professional footballer who played in the Football League for Leicester City, Bristol Rovers, Exeter City, Gillingham and Rochdale as a left half. He also played in the Scottish League for Dunfermline Athletic.

Career statistics

References 

English Football League players
Association football wing halves
English Football League managers
Scottish footballers
Association football inside forwards
1906 births
1980 deaths
Sportspeople from East Dunbartonshire
Clapton Orient F.C. wartime guest players
Kilsyth Rangers F.C. players
Dunipace F.C. players
Dunfermline Athletic F.C. players
Scottish Football League players
Leicester City F.C. players
Bristol Rovers F.C. players
Exeter City F.C. players
Gillingham F.C. players
Rochdale A.F.C. players